Manara County is one of the 141 Cadastral divisions of New South Wales. It includes Ivanhoe.

Manara is believed to be derived from a local Aboriginal word and is also used for the nearby Manara Station.

Parishes within this county
A full list of parishes found within this county; their current LGA and mapping coordinates to the approximate centre of each location is as follows:

References

 
Counties of New South Wales